Jelena Agbaba (born 20 June 1997) is a Serbian handball player for Moyra-Budaörs Handball and the Serbian national team.

She represented Serbia at the 2020 European Women's Handball Championship.

Her older sister Marija Agbaba currently plays for Békéscsaba.

References

External links

Serbian female handball players
1997 births
Living people
Sportspeople from Kikinda
Expatriate handball players in Poland
Serbian expatriate sportspeople in Belarus
Serbian expatriate sportspeople in Hungary
Serbian expatriate sportspeople in Poland
Békéscsabai Előre NKSE players